() is a Finnish television mystery music game show based on South Korean programme I Can See Your Voice. It premiered on Nelonen on 16 October 2021.

Gameplay

Format
Presented with a group of seven "mystery singers" identified only by their occupation, a guest artist and contestant must attempt to eliminate bad singers from the group without ever hearing them sing, assisted by clues and a celebrity panel over the course of five rounds. At the end of the game, the last remaining mystery singer is revealed as either good or bad by means of a duet between them and one of the guest artists.

Rewards
The contestant must eliminate one mystery singer at the end of each round, receiving  if they eliminate a bad singer. If the singer is bad, the contestant's winnings is given to the bad singer instead.

Rounds
Each episode presents the guest artist and contestant with seven people whose identities and singing voices are kept concealed until they are eliminated to perform on the "stage of truth" or remain in the end to perform the final duet.

Production

Background and development
Sanoma first announced the development of the series in November 2020. It is produced by Warner Bros. International Television Production; the staff team is managed by executive producers Suvi Oja-Heiniemi and Antti Väisänen, producer Tuire Lindström, and directors Jan Aslak-Leino and Joona Kortesmäki.

Filming
Tapings for the programme took place at Logomo Studio in Turku. Due to the COVID-19 pandemic, it was filmed under health and safety protocols being implemented.

Episodes

Guest artists

Panelists

Reception

Television ratings

Source:

Notes

References

External links

International versions of I Can See Your Voice
2020s Finnish television series
2021 Finnish television series debuts
Finnish game shows
Finnish television series based on South Korean television series
Finnish-language television shows
Nelonen original programming
Finnish non-fiction television series